Ohioceras is an extinct genus of suborthochonic nautiloids from the Silurian of Ohio belonging to the orthoceroid family Kionoceratidae.

Ohioceras is characterized by a slightly curved longiconic shell with a circular to slightly depressed cross section. The surface is lined with broad, low, longitudinal ribs separated by distinct shallow grooves. The siphuncle is subcentral, apparently orthochoanitic.

References

 Sweet, Walter C. 1964. Nautiloidea-Orthocerida. Treatise on Invertebrate Paleontology, Part K. Geological Soc of America, and Univ Kansas Press.
  Ohioceras -Paleobio db.

Prehistoric nautiloid genera
Orthocerida